Peter Joseph Backor (April 29, 1919 – June 30, 1988) was a Canadian professional ice hockey defenceman who played 36 games in the National Hockey League for the Toronto Maple Leafs during the 1944–45 season The rest of his career, which lasted from 1939 to 1956, was spent in the minor leagues. he won the Stanley Cup with Toronto in 1945.

Career
Pete Backor was born in 1919 in Fort William, Ontario to Slovak parents who emigrated from Orava in northern Slovakia to Canada. Although he played just a single season in the NHL, Backor made it count as he helped the Toronto Maple Leafs win the Stanley Cup in 1945. After that season he spent the next 11 years playing in the minor leagues for the Pittsburgh Hornets of the AHL with whom he won the Calder Cup in 1952, the Hollywood Wolves of the PCHL and the Sault Ste. Marie Indians of the NOHA. Backor retired from hockey in 1956.

He was one of the first players of Slovak descent in the NHL.

Personal life
He was brother-in-law to another NHL legend of Slovak descent Rudy Migay who played for Toronto Maple Leafs.

Career statistics

Regular season and playoffs

Achievements
 AHL First All-Star Team (1946, 1948, 1949, 1950, 1951)
 Stanley Cup Champions 1945 (with Toronto)

External links
 
 Picture of Pete Backor's Name on the 1945 Stanley Cup Plaque

1919 births
1988 deaths
Canadian expatriates in the United States
Canadian ice hockey defencemen
Canadian people of Slovak descent
Hollywood Wolves players
Ice hockey people from Ontario
Ontario Hockey Association Senior A League (1890–1979) players
Pittsburgh Hornets players
Sportspeople from Thunder Bay
Stanley Cup champions
Toronto Maple Leafs players